Starr is a town in Anderson County, South Carolina, United States. The population was 173 at the 2010 census.

Geography
Starr is located in southern Anderson County at  (34.377983, -82.693870).

Education
Elementary schools in Starr:
 Starr Elementary
 Flat-Rock Elementary
Middle schools in Starr:
 Starr-Iva Middle School

Demographics

As of the census of 2000, there were 173 people, 74 households, and 50 families residing in the town. The population density was 116.8 people per square mile (45.1/km2). There were 82 housing units at an average density of 55.4 per square mile (21.4/km2). The racial makeup of the town was 94.22% White, 3.47% African American, 0.58% from other races, and 1.73% from two or more races. Hispanic or Latino of any race were 2.89% of the population.

There were 74 households, out of which 24.3% had children under the age of 18 living with them, 59.5% were married couples living together, 5.4% had a female householder with no husband present, and 31.1% were non-families. 27.0% of all households were made up of individuals, and 12.2% had someone living alone who was 65 years of age or older. The average household size was 2.34 and the average family size was 2.82.

In the town, the population was spread out, with 19.1% under the age of 18, 9.2% from 18 to 24, 26.0% from 25 to 44, 31.8% from 45 to 64, and 13.9% who were 65 years of age or older. The median age was 40 years. For every 100 females, there were 98.9 males. For every 100 females age 18 and over, there were 91.8 males.

The median income for a household in the town was $34,167, and the median income for a family was $41,875. Males had a median income of $27,250 versus $21,875 for females. The per capita income for the town was $16,350. About 25.0% of families and 29.6% of the population were below the poverty line, including 46.3% of those under the age of eighteen and 18.5% of those 65 or over.

Notable people
Wilton E. Hall, (March 11, 1901 – February 25, 1980), Publishing and broadcasting executive. Hall also served briefly as a United States senator from South Carolina (in office November 20, 1944 – January 3, 1945), was a native of Starr.
Kip Anderson (January 24, 1938 – August 29, 2007), soul and blues musician, also worked at WANS radio as a DJ in the 1990s.

References

External links
 The official Facebook page for the Town of Starr
 Information about the Town of Starr at the Appalachian Council of Governments

Towns in Anderson County, South Carolina
Towns in South Carolina